Barnsboro Hotel is located in Mantua Township, Gloucester County, New Jersey. The hotel was built in 1720 and was added to the National Register of Historic Places on January 25, 1973.

See also
National Register of Historic Places listings in Gloucester County, New Jersey

References

Hotel buildings on the National Register of Historic Places in New Jersey
Hotel buildings completed in 1720
Buildings and structures in Gloucester County, New Jersey
National Register of Historic Places in Gloucester County, New Jersey
New Jersey Register of Historic Places
1720 establishments in New Jersey
Mantua Township, New Jersey